Zealoctenus is a genus of spiders in the family Miturgidae. It was first described in 1973 by Forster & Wilton. , it contains only one species, Zealoctenus cardronaensis, found in New Zealand.

References

Miturgidae
Monotypic Araneomorphae genera
Spiders of New Zealand